August 2 is an Indian Hindi-language film directed by P V Krishnan. It was claimed to be a true independent mainstream film made within its budget. Producers of the film claims that the film is made on the micro budget of Rs. 300,000. The film had got selected for the Red Carpet Premier in The Indian Independent Film Festival 2013.

Plot 
This story is about three different people who are having their own plans for the day, A character called Naveen who had a recent rift with his girlfriend plans to apologize her to bury the hatred between them and get her back and the other characters Jay and his wife Anvitha who were on their way to a marriage will get in trouble with their car in a midway. It is too late by the time they realize that the day had its own plans for them.

Cast 
Rahul Azad
Joyita Das
Sameer Rehman
Raksha

Music 
Background of the film was given by the Kannada music composer VinuManasu and Russian electronic music composer Di Evantile

Awards 
It got selected for a Red Carpet Premiere for The Indian Independent Film Festival 2013, Bangalore.

References 

 A-feature-film-by-one-man-crew
 one-man-crew-film-creates-wonders
 WATCH AUGUST2 ON ZINGREEL 
 A movie in just 12 days by 1 man crew 
 how-a-one-man-crew-made-a-feature-film 
 INDIAN INDEPENDENT FILM FESTIVAL 2013
 IMDB
 AUGUST 2 MOVIE OFFICIAL SITE Emotion Sellers Production Pvt Ltd.
 AUGUST 2 ON FACEBOOK
 AUGUST 2 ON DIEVANTILE.com

External links 

2012 films
Indian thriller films
2012 thriller films
2010s Hindi-language films
Indian independent films
2012 independent films
Hindi-language thriller films